Long Reach is a rural locality in the local government area (LGA) of George Town in the Launceston LGA region of Tasmania. The 2016 census recorded a population of nil for the state suburb of Long Reach.

History 
Long Reach is a confirmed locality.

Geography
The waters of the Tamar River Estuary form the south-western boundary.

Road infrastructure 
Route A8 (East Tamar Highway) passes through from south to north.

References

Towns in Tasmania
Localities of George Town Council